Claude Malhuret (born 8 March 1950) is a French physician and politician of Agir who has been a member of the Senate since 2014,  representing the department of Allier. 

Previously, Malhuret was the mayor of Vichy, France (1989–2017), a member of the National Assembly (1993–1997) and of the European Parliament (1989–1993).

Early life and career
Malhuret was born in Strasbourg. After completing his doctorate in medicine at the University of Paris, he worked as a hospital intern. In 1973, Malhuret participated in some voluntary overseas work with Coopération Française, before being employed by the World Health Organization in India. 

Malhuret was elected president of Médecins Sans Frontières in 1977. Malhuret's humanitarian aid was beginning to be noticed, and in 1978 he became the President of France's overseas relief agency. 

In 1980, Malhuret was one of the organizers of the "March for the Survival of Cambodia" in Thailand, with several media and artistic personalities, and read a speech written by Bernard-Henri Lévy.

Political career

Career in government
From 1986 to 1988, Malhuret served as Secretary of State for Human Rights in the government of Prime Minister Jacques Chirac, the first in this position.

Member of the European Parliament, 1989–1993
From 1989 to 1993, Malhuret was a Member of the European Parliament. In parliament, he served on the Committee on Political Affairs (1989–1990) and the Committee on Culture, Youth, Education and the Media (1992–1993). In addition to his committee assignments, he was part of the parliament’s delegation for relations with Japan.

Mayor of Vichy, 1989–2017
Malhuret was elected mayor of Vichy and President of the Vichy Urban District in 1989. He initiated a massive programme to modernize and restore the glory of the town, alongside other economic partners. This included the construction of a vast pedestrian area, upgrading of various hotels and renovation of the spas and Opera House.

Malhuret stepped down to Vice-President of the Vichy Urban District in 2001, but remained the mayor of Vichy.

Member of the Senate, 2014–present
Malhuret first became a member of the French Senate in the 2014 elections.

Following the election of Emmanuel Macron as president, Malhuret left the Republicans and became one of the founding members of the new Agir party.

Other activities
 Korian, Member of the Board of Directors (2003–2014)

Political positions
In 2016, Malhuret publicly endorsed Alain Juppé in the Republicans’ primaries for the 2017 presidential elections.

References

1950 births
Living people
Physicians from Strasbourg
Politicians from Strasbourg
Union for French Democracy politicians
Union for a Popular Movement politicians
The Republicans (France) politicians
Agir (France) politicians
Deputies of the 10th National Assembly of the French Fifth Republic
French Senators of the Fifth Republic
Senators of Allier
French humanitarians
Médecins Sans Frontières
20th-century French physicians
Paris Descartes University alumni